Garrison is an unincorporated community in western Millard County, Utah, United States.  It is home to a Utah Department of Transportation yard and office, but other than that, offers no services.

ZIP code
The 84728 ZIP code, which includes Garrison as the primary population center, has 158 residents spread out over 335.54 square miles. The median household income is $37,857 and 62 out of 83 housing units are occupied. Three public school run by the Millard School District serve the area covered by the ZIP code: the Garrison School (elementary), Garrison 7th & 8th, and Eskdale High School.

Geography 

Garrison is located in Snake Valley in the far west central area of the state just east of the Nevada state line. In fact, some of the town's farms and structures are legally in Nevada.  The Great Basin National Park is in Nevada just a few miles west of the border, accessed via Baker.

History 

Founded as a cattle rustling and outlaw community in the 1850s, the town of Garrison later became the center of mining interests. The name comes from the Garrison family who farmed in the area. After mining interests subsided, the Garrisons had a livestock and hay ranch. Mrs. Garrison was a schoolteacher who also handled the mail, and the town's name honors her.

Climate
Garrison experiences a semi-arid climate with hot summers and cold winter. Due to Garrison's elevation and aridity, the Diurnal temperature variation is substantial.

References

External links

Unincorporated communities in Utah
Unincorporated communities in Millard County, Utah
Populated places established in the 1850s